WFJV-LP (107.5 FM) was a low-power FM radio station licensed to serve Citronelle, Florida, United States. The station was owned by WFJV Community Radio Group.

WFJV-LP broadcast a religious talk format.

History
The station was assigned the WFJV-LP call sign by the Federal Communications Commission on May 27, 2002.

WFJV-LP radio first signed on in early 2003, operating at 107.5 MHz; it had a blend of contemporary hit music and select oldies along with news, public affairs and religious programming.

On September 13, 2005, Tampa Bay-area radio station WXGL 107.3 FM was granted a permit to move its transmitting facilities from Oldsmar to the WDUV transmitter site in Holiday. This would put WXGL's transmitter much closer to WFJV-LP and would cause severe interference to WFJV-LP, being only one channel away at 107.5. WFJV-LP immediately filed with the FCC an application to move frequency to 103.3 MHz. It was granted December 1, 2004 and WFJV-LP began operating on its new frequency March 1, 2005. During this transition, it changed its format to its recent format of Bible Study and Gospel. On March 30, 2005, the permit to move transmitter sites for WXGL had expired and was canceled. The station was licensed to move back to the 107.5 FM frequency on November 15, 2017.

The FCC cancelled WFJV-LP's license on November 8, 2022, due to the station having apparently been silent since May 2, 2020.

See also
List of community radio stations in the United States

References

External links

Radio stations established in 2003
Citrus County, Florida
FJV-LP
Community radio stations in the United States
2003 establishments in Florida
FJV-LP
Defunct radio stations in the United States
Radio stations disestablished in 2022
2022 disestablishments in Florida